Tremor by the Xiph.Org Foundation is a fixed-point version of the Vorbis decoder for those platforms without floating point operations.

It is a software library that decodes the Vorbis audio format. It is free software released under the New BSD license. Tremor uses fixed-point and movable-point arithmetic numeric representations in its implementation so that it can be used by small embedded devices, which typically do not have floating-point processors. Thus, Tremor enables small embedded devices to play audio files stored in the Vorbis format. Tremor was originally developed by Xiph.Org as a part of a contract for the Iomega HipZip, but was since opened up to encourage wider use of the Vorbis format. Almost all hardware devices that can play Vorbis, and many software implementations on embedded devices (such as mobile phones) use Tremor or some descendant.

Xiph.Org has expressed interest in modifying Tremor into a floating-point version, which would replace the current floating-point reference decoder, after the release of libogg2.

References

External links 
 Tremor at the Xiph.Org Foundation wiki

Audio codecs
Xiph.Org projects